The 1935 Holy Cross Crusaders football team was an American football team that represented the College of the Holy Cross as an independent during the 1935 college football season. In their third season under head coach Eddie Anderson, the Crusaders compiled a 9–0–1 record. It was the first undefeated season in school history. Nicholas Morris was the team captain.

Schedule

References

Holy Cross
Holy Cross Crusaders football seasons
College football undefeated seasons
Holy Cross Crusaders football